was a Japanese writer. He was the first winner of the Akutagawa Prize.

Biography
Born in Yokote, Akita Prefecture, Japan, Ishikawa was raised in several places, including Kyoto and Okayama Prefecture. He entered Waseda University's literature department but left before graduating.  In 1930 he left Japan for Brazil and worked on a farm.  Ishikawa won the first Akutagawa Prize in 1935 for Sōbō (蒼氓), a novel based on his experiences in Brazil.

In December 1937, Ishikawa was dispatched to Nanjing as a special reporter by the Chūō Kōron publishing company.  After landing in Shanghai, he arrived in Nanjing in January 1938, weeks after the fall of the city to the Imperial Japanese Army.  Embedded within an army unit later connected to the Nanking Massacre, Ishikawa wrote a fictional account (Ikite iru Heitai 生きている兵隊) of the atrocities suffered by Chinese civilians as well as the widespread pessimism of the Japanese soldiers.  Due to its controversial subject matter, nearly one-fourth of its contents was censored even before it was scheduled to be serialized in Chūō Kōron.  Still, the magazine was removed from circulation the day it was published and Ishikawa, the editor, and three publishers were arrested  under the 23rd article of the "Newspaper Law" (Shinbunshi Hō 新聞紙法) for "causing disturbance to peace and order".  Ishikawa was sentenced to four months imprisonment and placed on probation for three years.  Ikite iru Heitai was not to be published in its entirety until after the war, in December 1945. For a complete English translation, see Soldiers Alive (Trans. Zeljko Cipris, Honolulu: University of Hawai'i Press, 2003).

In 1946, he unsuccessfully ran for a seat in the lower house of the Diet of Japan in the 1946 Japanese general election. Ishikawa continued to be an active writer after the war, and in 1969, he won the Kikuchi Kan Prize (Kikuchi Kan Shō 菊池寛賞) for his contributions to Japanese literature. He was an active member of the Japan Art Academy. He died in Tokyo in 1985.

Bibliography
 Sōbō (蒼氓) (1935)
 Ikite iru Heitai (生きている兵隊, Soldiers Alive) – 1945 / English translation: 2003
 Kinkanshoku (金鐶蝕) (1966)

Awards
 1935 – Akutagawa Prize for Sōbō (蒼氓)
 1969 – Kikuchi Kan Prize

References

1905 births
1985 deaths
People from Yokote, Akita
20th-century Japanese novelists
Writers from Akita Prefecture
Akutagawa Prize winners
Japanese war correspondents
Members of the Japan Art Academy
Japanese prisoners and detainees
Presidents of the Japan Writers’ Association